Glochidion is a genus of flowering plants, of the family Phyllanthaceae, known as cheese trees or buttonwood in Australia, and leafflower trees in the scientific literature. It comprises about 300 species, distributed from Madagascar to the Pacific Islands. Glochidion species are used as food plants by the larvae of some Lepidoptera species including Aenetus eximia and Endoclita damor. The Nicobarese people have attested to the medicinal properties found in G. calocarpum, saying that its bark and seed are most effective in curing abdominal disorders associated with amoebiasis.

Glochidion are of note in the fields of pollination biology and coevolution because they have a specialized mutualism with moths in the genus Epicephala (leafflower moths), in which the moths actively pollinate the flowers—thereby ensuring that the tree may produce viable seeds—but also lay eggs in the flowers' ovaries, where their larvae consume a subset of the developing seeds as nourishment. Other species of Epicephala are pollinators, and in some cases, non-pollinating seed predators, of certain species of plants in the genera Phyllanthus and Breynia, both closely related to Glochidion. This relationship is similar to those between figs and fig wasps and yuccas and yucca moths.

Although the genus Glochidion is native only to the Old World, the East Asian species Glochidion puberum has become naturalized at several locations in the U.S. state of Alabama.

In a 2006 revision of the Phyllanthaceae, it was recommended that Glochidion be subsumed in Phyllanthus. New combinations in Phyllanthus have been published for Madagascar and the Pacific Islands, but most remain to be published.

Selected species
An incomplete listing:

Glochidion apodogynum 
Glochidion barronense 
Glochidion benthamianum 
Glochidion bourdillonii
Glochidion calocarpum
Glochidion christophersenii
Glochidion carrickii
Glochidion comitum
Glochidion disparipes 
Glochidion eriocarpum
Glochidion ferdinandi  - cheese tree, buttonwood, pencil cedar, water gum, rain tree
var. ferdinandi
var. pubens 
Glochidion gardneri 
Glochidion grantii
Glochidion harveyanum  - buttonwood, daphne buttonwood
var. harveyanum
var. pubescens 
Glochidion hylandii 
Glochidion insulare
Glochidion johnstonei
Glochidion lanceolarium
Glochidion lobocarpum 
Glochidion longfieldiae
Glochidion manono
Glochidion marchionicum
Glochidion moonii
Glochidion moorei
Glochidion myrtifolium
Glochidion nadeaudii
Glochidion orientalis
Glochidion papenooense
Glochidion pauciflorum
Glochidion perakense  - umbrella cheese tree, buttonwood
var. supra-axillare 
Glochidion philippicum 
Glochidion pitcairnense
Glochidion pruinosum 
Glochidion puberum
Glochidion pungens 
Glochidion raivavense
Glochidion ramiflorum J.R.Forst. & G.Forst.
Glochidion rapaense
Glochidion seemannii Müll.-Arg.
Glochidion sessiliflorum 
var. pedicellatum 
var. sessiliflorum
var. stylosum 
Glochidion sisparense
Glochidion stellatum
Glochidion stylosum
Glochidion sumatranum 
Glochidion symingtonii
Glochidion taitense
Glochidion temehaniense
Glochidion tomentosum
Glochidion tooviianum
Glochidion xerocarpum

References

External links

 Youtube video of a Glochidion lanceolarium flower being pollinated by an Epicephala lanceolaria moth

 
Phyllanthaceae genera